

mo

mob-moc
Moban
mobecarb (INN)
mobenakin (INN)
mobenzoxamine (INN)
Mobic
mocetinostat (USAN, INN)
mocimycin (INN)
mociprazine (INN)
moclobemide (INN)
moctamide (INN)
Moctanin

mod-moh
modafinil (INN)
modaline (INN)
modecainide (INN)
Moderil
Modicon
modipafant (INN)
modithromycin (INN)
Modrastane
Moduretic
moexipril (INN)
moexiprilat (INN)
mofarotene (INN)
mofebutazone (INN)
mofegiline (INN)
mofezolac (INN)
mofloverine (INN)
mofoxime (INN)
moguisteine (INN)
Mohexal (Hexal Australia) [Au]. Redirects to moclobemide.

mol-mom
molfarnate (INN)
molgramostim (INN)
molinazone (INN)
molindone (INN)
molracetam (INN)
molsidomine (INN)
mometasone (INN)

mon-moq
monalazone disodium (INN)
monatepil (INN)
monensin (INN)
Monistat
monobenzone (INN)
Monocid
Monodox
monoethanolamine oleate (INN)
Monoket
monometacrine (INN)
monophosphothiamine (INN)
Monopril
monoxerutin (INN)
montelukast (INN)
monteplase (INN)
montirelin (INN)
Monurol
moperone (INN)
mopidamol (INN)
mopidralazine (INN)
moprolol (INN)
moquizone (INN)

mor-mov
morantel (INN)
morazone (INN)
morclofone (INN)
morforex (INN)
moricizine (INN)
morinamide (INN)
morniflumate (INN)
morocromen (INN)
moroctocog alfa (INN)
morolimumab (INN)
moroxydine (INN)
morpheridine (INN)
morphine (INN)
morsuximide (INN)
mosapramine (INN)
mosapride (INN)
motapizone (INN)
motavizumab (INN)
motesanib (USAN)
motexafin gadolinium (USAN)
motexafin lutetium (USAN)
Motofen
motrazepam (INN)
motretinide (INN)
Motrin
moveltipril (INN)

mox-moz
moxadolen (INN)
Moxam
moxaprindine (INN)
moxastine (INN)
moxaverine (INN)
moxazocine (INN)
moxestrol (INN)
moxetumomab pasudotox (INN)
moxicoumone (INN)
moxidectin (INN)
moxifloxacin (INN)
moxilubant (INN)
moxipraquine (INN)
moxiraprine (INN)
moxisylyte (INN)
moxnidazole (INN)
moxonidine (INN)
mozavaptan (INN)